Persatuan Sepakbola Indonesia Cilegon (simply known as Persigon Cilegon) is an Indonesian football club based in Cilegon, Banten. They currently compete in the Liga 3 and their homeground is Krakatau Steel Stadium.

References

External links

Cilegon
Sport in Banten
Football clubs in Indonesia
Football clubs in Banten
Association football clubs established in 2020
2020 establishments in Indonesia